Cyprus has recognised same-sex unions since 9 December 2015. Legislation to establish civil cohabitations was approved by the Cypriot Parliament on 26 November 2015, and took effect on 9 December upon publication in the government gazette.

Civil cohabitation

Background
In 2010, the Interior Ministry Permanent Secretary, Lazaros Savvides, indicated that the Cypriot Government was considering whether to legalise same-sex marriage in Cyprus. This was followed in 2013 with an announcement by Interior Minister Eleni Mavrou that her ministry was working on a parliamentary bill to establish civil partnerships. The Cypriot Government subsequently gave its official approval to the draft bill. In March of that year, President Nicos Anastasiades, who had been elected in the 2013 presidential election, reaffirmed his support for the bill. In November 2013, Interior Minister Socratis Hasikos confirmed that the bill remained on the government agenda. A draft had been prepared and was sent to other ministries for review, with the intention of holding a parliamentary vote in April 2014. In June 2014, the Interior Ministry Permanent Secretary, Constantinos Nicolaides, confirmed that the bill had been delayed. Hasikos clarified that a proposed bill would "need consensus from all political parties before moving forward". He gave all parties a copy of the bill and asked that they study it in time for a second meeting that September. Hasikos stressed that "he would not hold a vote until he was sure all parties were in favour".

In March 2014, the head of the Orthodox Church in Cyprus, Archbishop Chrysostomos II, signalled his opposition to plans to introduce either civil partnership or marriage rights, urging churches to take a stand against homosexuality and accusing secular governments of "weakening moral integrity" through acknowledging equal rights to gay people: "When, for example, governments legalise not only plain civil partnership but 'homosexual marriage', the Church must be unequivocal in condemning homosexuality."

Passage of legislation in 2015

On 6 May 2015, the Council of Ministers approved a bill establishing gender-neutral "cohabitation agreements", offering many of the rights, benefits and responsibilities of marriage. On 6 June 2015, the ruling Democratic Rally (DISY) party announced its support for the partnership law. The bill had its first reading on 18 June. On 1 July, the House of Representatives decided to rename the proposed partnership recognition scheme to "civil cohabitation". The second reading was initially scheduled for 9 July, but was postponed until autumn. The bill passed its second and third reading on 26 November 2015 in a 39–12 vote with 3 abstentions. Those voting in favour were members of the ruling DISY party, the Democratic Party (DIKO), the Progressive Party of Working People (AKEL), the Movement for Social Democracy, the Ecological and Environmental Movement, and the European Party. Of the 12 MPs that voted against the bill, 6 were members of DISY, 3 were members of DIKO, 1 was a member of Citizens' Alliance, 1 was a member of AKEL, and 1 was an independent. The 3 lawmakers who abstained were all members of DISY. The law was signed by President Anastasiades, published in the government gazette on 9 December 2015 and took effect that same day. The first civil partnership was registered on 29 January 2016 between two women. The first public ceremony was held in Nicosia on 4 March 2016 between Marios Frixou and Fanos Eleftheriades.

The legislation established a partnership scheme known as civil cohabitation, open to both same-sex and opposite-sex couples. This provides civil partners with the several of the legal rights and benefits of marriage, such as hospital visitation rights, tax benefits, property rights, etc., but excluding adoption rights.

Statistics
By 18 April 2016, eight same-sex partnerships had been registered in Cyprus. By October of the same year, that number had increased to approximately 70 couples.

Civil partnerships are also popular among different-sex couples. As of August 2017, heterosexual couples accounted for about 70% of all partnerships, while same-sex couples made up the remaining 30%. By December 2020, around 1,700 partnerships had been registered, with 90% of these being between heterosexual couples.

Same-sex marriage
Same-sex marriage is not legal in Cyprus. The Constitution of Cyprus does not explicitly ban same-sex marriages. Article 22 states that "[a]ny person reaching nubile age is free to marry and to found a family according to the law relating to marriage, applicable to such person under the provisions of this Constitution." In September 2022, activists campaigned for legalization at Cyprus Pride. A number of candidates running in the 2023 presidential election have stated their support for same-sex marriage, including the winner and president-elect, Nikos Christodoulides, and runner-up Andreas Mavroyiannis.

Public opinion
The 2006 Eurobarometer found that only 14% of Cypriots were in favour of same-sex marriage. This was the third lowest in the European Union at the time; only in Latvia and Romania was support lower. The 2015 Eurobarometer found that support had increased to 37%, while 56% were opposed.

A 2014 survey found that 53.3% of Cypriots supported civil unions or partnerships for same-sex couples.

The 2019 Eurobarometer found that 36% of Cypriots thought same-sex marriage should be allowed throughout Europe, while 60% were opposed.

See also
 LGBT rights in Cyprus
 Recognition of same-sex unions in Europe
 Same-sex marriage in Akrotiri and Dhekelia

Notes

References

LGBT rights in Cyprus
Cyprus
Cyprus